WQXD-LP (97.9 FM) was a radio station licensed to serve Athens, Alabama. The station was last owned by Emmanuel Full Gospel Ministries. It aired a Christian country music format.

The station was assigned the WQXD-LP call letters by the Federal Communications Commission (FCC) on February 6, 2006. The station surrendered its license on October 24, 2022, and the FCC cancelled it the same day.

References

External links
WQXD-LP official website

WQXD-LP service area per the FCC database

QXD-LP
QXD-LP
Defunct radio stations in the United States
Limestone County, Alabama
Radio stations established in 2003
Radio stations disestablished in 2022
2003 establishments in Alabama
2022 disestablishments in Alabama
Defunct religious radio stations in the United States
QXD-LP